Basil Kfoury (born in 1794 in Khonchara, Lebanon - died on 5 April 1859) was bishop of the Patriarchal Vicariate of Egypt and Sudan named by Patriarch Maximos III Mazloum.

Life

Basile Kfoury was appointed on 5 September 1837 Bishop of Alexandria. Melkite Patriarch of Alexandria Maximos III Mazloum was his consecrator and his co-consecrators were Théodore Abou-Karim (Titular Bishop of Alia and Vicar Apostolic of the Coptic Catholic Church of Alexandria) and Giuiseppe Angelo di Fazio, OFM (Titular Bishop of Tipaza and Vicar Apostolic of Aleppo in Syria). He was co-consekrator of Athanase Khouzan (Titular Archbishop of Maronea and Vicar Apostolic of the Coptic Church of Alexandria). His successor was Joannitius Massamiri.

References

External links
 Bishop Basile Kfoury, Catholic-Hierarchy.org
 Melkite GMA INC Uniting Melkite Worldwide

1794 births
1859 deaths
Melkite Greek Catholic bishops
Lebanese Melkite Greek Catholics